The 2019 Baltimore Brigade season was the third season for the Baltimore Brigade in the Arena Football League. The Brigade played at the Royal Farms Arena and were coached by Omarr Smith for the 2019 season.

Standings

Schedule

Regular season
The 2019 regular season schedule was released on February 13, 2019. All times Eastern.

Postseason

Game summaries

Roster

References

Baltimore Brigade
Baltimore Brigade seasons
21st century in Maryland
2019 in sports in Maryland